Oak Hill High School is a high school located in Wales, Maine, United States. A part of Regional School Unit 4, this regional high school serves students from the towns of Sabattus, Litchfield, and Wales.  The mascot is the Raider, generally represented by a raccoon.

Extracurricular activities 
The school has several extracurricular activities, including:
 Civil Rights Team
 Drama Club
 Future Business Leaders of America (FBLA
 French Club
 Academic Decathlon
 Ski Club
 Olympia Snow
 Robotics

Sports 
The school offers a variety of sports, covering the fall, winter, and spring seasons.
Fall sports include football, boys/girls soccer, cheering, cross country running, and field hockey.  Winter sports include boys/girls basketball, wrestling as a co-op with Lisbon High School, ice hockey, winter cheering.  Spring sports include baseball, softball, lacrosse, Track (at Lisbon High School) and boys/girls tennis.

References

External links 
 

Public high schools in Maine
Schools in Androscoggin County, Maine